Pajić (Serbian, Croatian) or Pajič (Slovene) is a surname, a patronymic of Pajo or Paja. Notable people with the surname include:

Dejan Pajić (born 1989), Serbian sprint canoer
Ksenija Pajić (born 1961), Croatian actress
Marko Pajić (born 1992), Slovenian basketball player 
Murajica Pajič (born 1961), Slovenian ice hockey player
Nancy Wilson-Pajic (born 1941) American visual artist
Predrag Pajić (born 1993), Macedonian basketball player 
Rok Pajič (born 1985), Slovenian ice hockey player
Sladjan Pajić (born 1992), Austrian-Serbian footballer
Slobodan Pajic (born 1943), visual artist